The 2010 Beijing Superleague Formula round was a Superleague Formula round  held on October 10, 2010, at the Beijing International Street Circuit, Beijing, China. It was Superleague Formula's second visit to China, after previously visiting the  Ordos International Circuit the week before. It was also the first time the championship raced on a street circuit. It was a non-championship event, after the track failed to gain the required FIA Grade 2 status in order to host a championship event. It was originally scheduled to be the eleventh round of the 2010 Superleague Formula season.

Nineteen cars took part including Chinese outfits Beijing Guoan and Team China.

Support races for the event were from the China Touring Car Championship.

Report

Qualifying

Race 1

Race 2

Super Final
 The race was cancelled due to poor track and weather conditions.

Results

Qualifying
 In each group, the top four qualify for the quarter-finals.

Group A

Group B

Knockout stages

Grid

Race 1

Race 2

Super Final

Standings after the round

References

External links
 Official results from the Superleague Formula website
 Ticket information for the race

Beijing
Superleague Formula Beijing